Brian Froud (born December 1, 1973) is an ACTRA Awards winning voice actor and voice director best known for his versatile voice work in animation. His credits include lead roles in Total Drama (Harold & Sam), Jimmy Two-Shoes (Beezy), Detentionaire (Lynch Webber), ToonMarty (The title character) and Zafari (Quincy & Antonio). Brian is the voice director of Chop Chop Ninja, an animated series based on the popular video game series.

Filmography

Anime

Film

Television

External links

 
 
Article on Brian Froud from The Toronto Star
Interview with Brian Froud from Courageous Nerd

Canadian stand-up comedians
Canadian male voice actors
Living people
Place of birth missing (living people)
1973 births